The Edgar Allan Poe Award for Best Episode in a TV Series was established in 1952. The Edgar Allan Poe Award for Best Episode in a TV Series winners are listed below.

Recipients

1950s

1960s

1970s

1980s

1990s

2000s

2010s

2020s

See also
Edgar Award
Mystery Writers of America
Winners
Winning works

References

External links
The official website of Edgar Awards

Mystery and detective fiction awards
English-language literary awards